Edward Skilton (26 September 1863 – 21 June 1917) was a British sport shooter who competed in the 1912 Summer Olympics. In 1912 he won the silver medal with the British team in the team military rifle competition. In the 600 metre free rifle event he finished 16th.

References

External links
Edward Skilton's profile at databaseOlympics.com

1863 births
1917 deaths
British male sport shooters
ISSF rifle shooters
Olympic shooters of Great Britain
Shooters at the 1912 Summer Olympics
Olympic silver medallists for Great Britain
Olympic medalists in shooting
Medalists at the 1912 Summer Olympics
Sportspeople from London